Take Care & Control is an album by Death In June, released in 1998. This album is a collaboration with Albin Julius (Der Blutharsch), with whom Douglas P. would return to collaborate on the Operation Hummingbird album.

Track listing

Side 1 
 "Smashed To Bits (In the Peace of the Night)" - 4:49
 "Little Blue Butterfly" - 4:05
 "The Bunker" - 3:08
 "Kameradschaft" - 4:22
 "Frost Flowers" - 3:11
 "A Slaughter of Roses" - 3:13

Side 2
 "The November Men" - 7:44
 "Power Has a Fragrance" - 3:47
 "Despair" - 2:23
 "The Odin Hour" - 4:00
 "The Bunker, Empty" - 2:56
 "Wolf Angel" - 3:02

"Kameradschaft"
This exclusive 4-track CD single was included with the vinyl version of the album.
 "Kameradschaft 1" - 4:01
 "Satan's Feast" - 4:35
 "Kameradschaft 2" - 4:02
 "To Drown a Rose" (featuring John Balance on lead vocals) - 4:21

Death in June albums
1998 albums